Indonesia competed at the 1996 Summer Olympics in Atlanta, United States.

Medalists

| width="78%" align="left" valign="top"|  

| width="22%" align="left" valign="top"|

| width="22%" align="left" valign="top"|

| width="22%" align="left" valign="top" |

Competitors 
The following is the list of number of competitors participating in the Games:

Archery 

Indonesia's archers had only one victory in the archery competition. Nurfitriyana Lantang advanced to the second round before being defeated.

Athletics 

 Key
 Note–Ranks given for track events are within the athlete's heat only
 Q = Qualified for the next round
 q = Qualified for the next round as a fastest loser or, in field events, by position without achieving the qualifying target
 NR = National record
 N/A = Round not applicable for the event
 Bye = Athlete not required to compete in round

Badminton 

Men

Women

Mixed

Boxing

Judo

Sailing 

Men

Swimming

Table tennis 

Men's singles
 Anton Suseno - 3 of 4, Group O

Women's singles
 Rossy Pratiwi Dipoyanti - 4 of 4, Group M

Tennis

Volleyball

Beach
Men's beach
Markoji Markoji and Muchammad Nurmufid — 17th place overall

Women's beach
Eta Kaize and Timy Yudhani Rahayu — 13th place overall

Weightlifting

See also
 1996 Olympic Games
 1996 Paralympic Games
 Indonesia at the Olympics
 Indonesia at the Paralympics
 Indonesia at the 1996 Summer Paralympics

References

Nations at the 1996 Summer Olympics
1996
1996 in Indonesian sport